Hasan Rushdy (born 10 August 1971) is a Sri Lankan former first-class cricketer who played for Tamil Union Cricket and Athletic Club.

References

External links
 

1971 births
Living people
Sri Lankan cricketers
Burgher Recreation Club cricketers
Colombo Cricket Club cricketers
Nondescripts Cricket Club cricketers
Tamil Union Cricket and Athletic Club cricketers